Peter Lear may refer to:

Sir Peter Lear, 1st Baronet, of the Lear baronets
Peter Lear, pen name of Peter Lovesey

See also
Lear (surname)